Le François is a town and commune in the arrondissement of Le Marin on Martinique,  from the island capital of Fort-de-France.

Geography

Climate
Le François has a tropical monsoon climate (Köppen climate classification Am).

Population

See also
Communes of the Martinique department

References

External links
Official website  

Communes of Martinique
Populated places in Martinique